The Albanian is a 2010 German-Albanian drama film directed by Johannes Naber and starring the Albanian award-winning Nik Xhelilaj.

Plot 
For the sake of love and the situations imposed by the life in his country, Arben emigrates to Germany. An illegal emigration, in search of money, a subtle condition to protect his love; an adventure that unintentionally confronts him with the unmerciful world of crime.

Cast
Nik Xhelilaj as Arben
Xhejlane Tërbunia as Etleva
Ivan Shvedoff as Slatko
Amos Zaharia as Ilir
Stipe Erceg as Damir
Eva Löbau as Nicola
Çun Lajçi as Arben's father
Luan Jaha as Arben's uncle
Yllka Mujo as Etleva's mother
Guljelm Radoja as Etleva's father
Bruno Shllaku as Sali
Julian Deda as Florenç
André Hennicke as Pharmacist
Besmir Halitaj as Taulant
Ledio Janushi as Skerdi
Elton Lomthi as Artan
Hazir Sh. Haziri as Edon

Awards and competition 
Within a short screening period, the film has won several awards and the sympathy of the audience. The leading actor Nik Xhelilaj has earned three Best Leading Actor awards until now in three different film festivals.

Awards won
Filmfestival Max Ophüls Preis 2011
Best Film / Max-Ophüls-Preis
Cinéma Tous Ecrans - Geneva international Film Festival 2010
Best Film "Reflet d'Or" (Ex aequo)
Public Award for Best long feature film
32nd Moscow International Film Festival
Special Jury Prize "Silver George"
Best Actor Prize "Silver George" for Nik Xhelilaj
Bergen International Film Festival 2010
Special Jury Mention
PriFilmFest - Prishtina International Film Festival 2010
Special Jury Award for the film
"Golden Goddess" Best Actor Award for Nik Xhelilaj
47th Antalya "Golden Orange" International Film Festival
Best Actor Award for Nik Xhelilaj in the International Feature Competition

The film has also competed in other film festivals such as 45th Karlovy Vary International Film Festival and 22nd Palm Springs International Film Festival and 15th Busan International Film Festival.

References

External links
 

2010 films
Albanian-language films
2010s German-language films
Films set in Albania
Films set in Germany
2010 drama films
Albanian drama films
German drama films
2010s German films